In enzymology, a 5-(carboxyamino)imidazole ribonucleotide mutase is an enzyme that catalyzes the chemical reaction

5-carboxyamino-1-(5-phospho-D-ribosyl)imidazole  5-amino-1-(5-phospho-D-ribosyl)imidazole-4-carboxylate

Hence, this enzyme has one substrate, 5-carboxyamino-1-(5-phospho-D-ribosyl)imidazole, and one product, 5-amino-1-(5-phospho-D-ribosyl)imidazole-4-carboxylate.

This enzyme belongs to the family of isomerases, specifically those intramolecular transferases transferring other groups.  The systematic name of this enzyme class is 5-carboxyamino-1-(5-phospho-D-ribosyl)imidazole carboxymutase. Other names in common use include N5-CAIR mutase, PurE, N5-carboxyaminoimidazole ribonucleotide mutase, and class I PurE.

References

 
 
 
 
 
 

EC 5.4.99
Enzymes of unknown structure